Statistics of Czechoslovak First League in the 1970–71 season.

Overview
It was contested by 16 teams, and FC Spartak Trnava won the championship. Jozef Adamec and Zdeněk Nehoda were the league's top scorers with 16 goals each.

Stadia and locations

League standings

Results

Top goalscorers

References

Czechoslovakia - List of final tables (RSSSF)

Czechoslovak First League seasons
Czech
1